The Nurse's Secret is a 1941 murder mystery film directed by Noel M. Smith and starring Lee Patrick as a crime-solving nurse. The supporting cast features Regis Toomey and Julie Bishop.

The film, which includes a rare leading role for Patrick who played the supporting part of Sam Spade's secretary in The Maltese Falcon that same year, is a remake of the film Miss Pinkerton and is based on the 1932 novel Miss Pinkerton by Mary Roberts Rinehart. Rinehart wrote a series of novels based on the character Hilda Adams. She is, however, most famous for her play "The Bat" which inspired Batman creator Bob Kane to create his famous comic book character.

Plot
A nurse (Lee Patrick) moves into a mansion after an apparent suicide to care for the old mother. The mother is kind of spooky, but so is the butler, and the girlfriend, and the doctor. After the insurance policy is found, the plot thickens.

Cast
 Lee Patrick as Ruth Adams
 Regis Toomey as Inspector Patton
 Julie Bishop as Florence Lentz
 Clara Blandick as Miss Walker

See also
Miss Pinkerton (1932)

External links
 The Nurse's Secret at Internet Movie Database

1941 films
Films directed by Noel M. Smith
1941 mystery films
American mystery films
Films about nurses
Medical-themed films
American black-and-white films
Remakes of American films
Films based on works by Mary Roberts Rinehart
1940s American films